McDaniel Building is a historic commercial building located at Springfield, Greene County, Missouri. It was built in 1961, and is houses six-story with a Mid-Century Modern style of building, containing a two-story main section, two-bay section and a tall one-story rear section.  It has buff brick walls, a curtain wall façade, and a flat roof.

It was listed on the National Register of Historic Places in 2014.

References

Commercial buildings on the National Register of Historic Places in Missouri
Modernist architecture in Missouri
Commercial buildings completed in 1961
Buildings and structures in Springfield, Missouri
National Register of Historic Places in Greene County, Missouri